PromFest is an international opera festival held biennially in Pärnu, Estonia, since 1996. PromFest stands for Pärnu International Opera Music Festival in Estonian.

The main attraction of PromFest is an operatic production, in which the leading roles are performed by prizewinners from previous Klaudia Taev Competitions.

The artistic director of PromFest is conductor Erki Pehk.

History 

In addition to the biennial events, 2006 saw an Opera Gala, and 2008 a Puccini gala.

References

External links

Opera festivals
1996 establishments in Estonia
Classical music festivals in Estonia
Biennial events